Events from the year 2011 in the European Union.

Incumbents
President of the European Council – Herman Van Rompuy
Commission President – José Manuel Barroso
Council Presidency – Hungary (January–June) and Poland (July–December)
Parliament President – Jerzy Buzek
High Representative – Catherine Ashton

Events

January 
 January 1
 Hungary takes over the Presidency of the Council of the European Union from Belgium.
 Estonia officially adopts the Euro currency and becomes the seventeenth Eurozone country.
 Lithuania receives chairmanship of Organization for Security and Co-operation in Europe.

February 
 February 25 – EU ban on BPA in baby bottles enters into force.

March 
 March 15 – Council Implementing Regulation (EU) No. 282/2011 is adopted.

July 
 July 1 – Poland takes over the Presidency of the Council of the European Union from Hungary.

Other
 In 2011, Tallinn and Turku are designated as European capitals of culture by the European Union.

References

 
Years of the 21st century in the European Union
2010s in the European Union